Lyle Adams (born 19 December 1986 in Kingston) is a technology entrepreneur. He began his career as a professional soccer player, before moving on to the corporate world with positions at LivingSocial, Inc. and Uber technologies, Inc. In 2020, he founded Spry Payment Systems, Inc. and currently serves as the company's CEO.

Career

Youth and Amateur
Adams grew up in Orlando, Florida, attended Winter Park High School, played club soccer for the Central Florida United Soccer Club, and played college soccer at Wake Forest University, where he won an NCAA Division I national championship while graduating with an economics degree. During his college years he also played with both Central Florida Kraze and Carolina Dynamo in the USL Premier Development League.

Professional Athlete
Adams was drafted in the second round (26th overall) of the 2009 MLS SuperDraft by D.C. United, but decided to test the waters in Europe rather than sign with D.C. United.

After an unsuccessful trip to Europe where he was on trial with teams in Austria, Switzerland and Belgium, he joined the USL First Division expansion franchise Austin Aztex in March 2009. Adams made his professional debut, and scored his first professional goal, on 18 April 2009, in Austin's USL1 season opener against Minnesota Thunder.

He was released by the Aztex at the end of the 2009 season.

In the 2010 preseason, he trialed with D.C. United of Major League Soccer, and, on 17 March 2010, signed a developmental contract with them. Adams was released by D.C. United on 30 April 2010 without making a first-team league appearance.

Corporate
Adams began his professional career as an analyst at LivingSocial, Inc. in 2011. In the summer of 2012, he joined Uber Technologies, Inc. as an Operations and Logistics Manager in the Washington-DC Market. During his time at Uber, Adams held a variety of roles from product to analytics manager.

In April 2020, he founded Spry Payment Systems, Inc., "a comprehensive platform designed to help athletic departments adapt to the new NIL (Name, Image, and Likeness) landscape to ensure the success of their program and athletes."

Honors

Wake Forest University
NCAA Men's Division I Soccer Championship (1): 2007

Arlington, VA Men's Upper Championship: 2012, 2013

References

External links
 Austin Aztex bio
 Wake Forest profile
 Wake Forest Alumni activity
 Spry Payment Systems, Inc.

Living people
1986 births
Austin Aztex FC players
Orlando City U-23 players
Jamaican expatriate sportspeople in the United States
Wake Forest Demon Deacons men's soccer players
North Carolina Fusion U23 players
D.C. United players
USL League Two players
USL First Division players
Expatriate soccer players in the United States
Jamaican footballers
Jamaican expatriate footballers
D.C. United draft picks
Soccer players from Florida
People from Winter Park, Florida
Association football defenders